The 2013 Okayama GT 300km was the first round of the 2013 Super GT season. It took place on April 7, 2013.

Race result
Race result is as follows.

References

External links
Super GT official website 

Okayama GT 300km